Márta Megyeri (née Pacsai, born August 29, 1952, in Dorog) is a former Hungarian handball player who competed in the 1976 Summer Olympics, where she won the bronze medal with the Hungarian team. She had played in one match.

References

External links
Profile on Database Olympics

1952 births
Living people
Hungarian female handball players
Handball players at the 1976 Summer Olympics
Olympic handball players of Hungary
Olympic bronze medalists for Hungary
Olympic medalists in handball
Medalists at the 1976 Summer Olympics